Priscilla Beukes is a Namibian politician. A member of SWAPO, Beukes was elected to the National Assembly of Namibia in 2010. She was subsequently appointed to the cabinet as the Deputy Minister of Regional and Local Government, Housing and Energy Development behind Jerry Ekandjo. Beukes was previously mayor of Mariental, Hardap Region.

References

Year of birth missing (living people)
Living people
Mayors of places in Namibia
Women mayors of places in Namibia
Members of the National Assembly (Namibia)
People from Hardap Region
SWAPO politicians
Government ministers of Namibia
21st-century Namibian women politicians
21st-century Namibian politicians
Women government ministers of Namibia
Women members of the National Assembly (Namibia)